Parke Lake is a lake at an elevation of , located in Clarkston within Independence Township in Oakland County, Michigan, USA.

Dollar Lake connects downstream with the 23-acre Middle Lake.

Fish
Parke Lake fish include bass and bluegill.

References

Lakes of Oakland County, Michigan
Lakes of Michigan
Lakes of Independence Township, Michigan